Roberto Bautista Agut was the defending champion, but chose to compete in the ATP Cup instead.

Andrey Rublev won the title, defeating Corentin Moutet in the final, 6–2, 7–6(7–3).

Seeds

Draw

Finals

Top half

Bottom half

Qualifying

Seeds

Qualifiers

Qualifying draw

First qualifier

Second qualifier

Third qualifier

Fourth qualifier

References

Main Draw
Qualifying Draw

Qatar ExxonMobil Open - Singles
Singles
Qatar Open (tennis)